Bayle Mountain is a mountain located in Carroll County, New Hampshire, standing above Conner Pond.

See also

 List of mountains in New Hampshire

External links
  Bayle Mountain - FranklinSites.com Hiking Guide

Bayle
Bayle